Taractrocera trikora is a butterfly of the family Hesperiidae. It is only known from the area around Lake Habbema in New Guinea.

The habitat at the type locality consists of moorland, fens and sparse coniferous forest, and high mountain moss forests.

The length of the forewings is 9.6-11.8 mm.

External links
Phylogeny and biogeography of the genus Taractrocera Butler, 1870 (Lepidoptera: Hesperiidae), an example of Southeast Asian-Australian interchange

Taractrocerini
Butterflies described in 2004